Kamensky District  is an administrative district (raion), one of the twenty-three in Tula Oblast, Russia. As a municipal division, it is incorporated as Kamensky Municipal District. It is located in the south of the oblast. Its administrative center is the rural locality (a selo) of Arkhangelskoye. Population: 9,548 (2010 Census);  The population of Arkhangelskoye accounts for 25.0% of the district's total population.

References

Notes

Sources

Districts of Tula Oblast